A.I. Prince Technical High School, or Prince Tech, is a technical high school located in Hartford, Connecticut. Prince Tech receives students from many nearby towns. Prince Tech prepares students for both college and careers through the achievement of 21st-century skills. Prince Tech is a part of the Connecticut Technical High School System.

History 
The Hartford Trade School was founded in 1915. The school was renamed Albert I. Prince when it was moved from 110 Washington Street to 400 Brookfield Street in October 1960. Mr. Prince was the managing editor of The Hartford Times newspaper and served as the Chairman of the State Board of Education for 12 years.

Technologies
In addition to a complete academic program leading to a high school diploma, students attending Prince Tech receive training in one of the following trades and technologies:

 Automated Manufacturing Technology
 Automotive Collision Repair and Refinishing 
 Automotive Technology  
 Carpentry 
 Culinary Arts
 Electrical 
 Graphics Technology 
 Hairdressing and Cosmetology
 Health Technologies 
 Information Systems Technology
 Masonry 
 Plumbing and Heating 
 Sound Production Technology

References

Public high schools in Connecticut
Schools in Hartford, Connecticut
Educational institutions accredited by the Council on Occupational Education